Hilltown is an unincorporated community and census-designated place (CDP) in Grayson and Carroll counties, Virginia, United States. As of the 2020 census, it had a population of 216.

The CDP is in eastern Grayson County and western Carroll County, along Virginia State Route 94. It is bordered to the west by Stevens Creek and to the south by Fries. The New River passes within one mile of Hilltown to the south and east.

References 

Populated places in Carroll County, Virginia
Census-designated places in Carroll County, Virginia
Populated places in Grayson County, Virginia
Census-designated places in Grayson County, Virginia
Census-designated places in Virginia